Anacaena is a genus of water scavenger beetles in the subfamily Hydrophilinae. It is an extant genus but there is at least one fossil species.

Species
These species belong to the genus Anacaena. More than 100 species are included in this genus worldwide.

 Anacaena angatbuhay (Sanchez, Delocado & Freitag, 2022) i c g
 Anacaena auxilium (Sanchez, Delocado & Freitag, 2022) i c g
 Anacaena bipustulata (Marsham, 1802) i c g
 Anacaena conglobata (Wollaston, 1854) g
 Anacaena debilis (Sharp, 1882) i c g
 Anacaena gaetanae Bameul, 2001 g
 Anacaena globulus (Paykull, 1798) i c g
 Anacaena haemorrhoa (Wollaston, 1864) g
 Anacaena jengi Komarek, 2011 g
 Anacaena limbata (Fabricius, 1792) i c g b
 Anacaena lohsei Berge Henegouwen & Hebauer, 1989 g
 Anacaena lutescens (Stephens, 1829) i c g b
 Anacaena marchantiae (Wollaston, 1857) g
 †Anacaena paleodominica
 Anacaena parvula (Sharp, 1882) i c g
 Anacaena perpenna Orchymont, 1942 i c g
 Anacaena rufipes (Guillebeau, 1896) g
 Anacaena signaticollis Fall, 1924 i c g b
 Anacaena smetanai Komarek, 2011 g
 Anacaena sternalis Leech, 1948 i c g
 Anacaena suturalis (LeConte, 1866) i c g
 Anacaena taurica Ryndevich, 2000 g

Data sources: i = ITIS, c = Catalogue of Life, g = GBIF, b = Bugguide.net

References

External links 

 
 
 
 
 Anacaena at insectoid.info

Hydrophilidae genera
Hydrophilinae